Gabriele Chilà (born 17 September 1997) is an Italian long jumper, national champion in long jump indoor at senior level in 2020, he as a personal best of 8.00 m both outdoor (set in 2020) and indoor (set in 2019).

Career
At the under-23 level, he boasts two medals in two international events: silver in 2018 at the U23 Mediterranean Games and bronze the following year at the European U23 championships.

Achievements

References

External links
 

1997 births
Living people
Italian male long jumpers
Athletics competitors of Fiamme Gialle